Agelena incertissima is a species of spider in the family Agelenidae, which contains at least 1,350 species . It was first described by Caporiacco in 1940 and is native to Ethiopia.

References

incertissima
Spiders of Africa
Spiders described in 1939